Stony Ford may refer to:
Stonyford, California
Stony Ford, New York